Epinotia salicicolana is a species of moth of the family Tortricidae. It is found in China (Shaanxi), Taiwan, Japan and Russia.

The larvae feed on Salix caprea and Salix sachalinensis.

References

Moths described in 1968
Eucosmini